T. C. McCarthy is a science fiction author. His first novel, Germline, won the 2012 Compton Crook Award.

Education
McCarthy earned a bachelor's degree from the University of Virginia. He also earned a PhD in geology from the University of Georgia. While pursuing his PhD, McCarthy was a Fulbright scholar.

Writing
McCarthy's main work, a trilogy called the Subterrene War series, was originally intended to be a single book containing three novellas. The first novel in the series, Germline, won the 2012 Compton Crook Award. James Floyd Kelly, writing for Wired, called it "gritty" and "harsh," stating that "it takes real skill to lead a reader into actually seeing, smelling, and hearing (and maybe even tasting) the realities of war."

His writing influences include Michael Herr.

Awards and nominations
 2012: Won the Compton Crook Award for Best First Novel for Germline, Orbit Books, 2011 
 2013: Nominated for the Prometheus Award for Best Libertarian Novel of the Year for Chimera, Orbit Books, 2012

Bibliography

Novels
 Germline (August 1, 2011, Orbit Books) (Compton Crook Award winner)
 Exogene (March 1, 2012, Orbit Books)
 Chimera (July 31, 2012, Orbit Books)
 Tyger Burning (July 2, 2019, Baen Books)
 Tyger Bright (February 2, 2021, Baen Books)

Novelettes
 "The Legionnaires" (April 18, 2011, Orbit Books)
 "A People's Army (March 15, 2012, Orbit Books)
 "Sunshine" (June 15, 2012, Orbit Books)

Short fiction
 "A Dry and Dusty Home" (Spring, 2010, Per Contra: The International Journal of the Arts, Literature, and Ideas, Issue 18)
 "Private Exploration" (June 2, 2011, Nature, Vol. 474, p. 120) 
 "A.I.P." (2012, Story Quarterly, Vol. 45)
 "Seven Miles" (2013, Baen Books)

References

External links
 Official website
 T. C. McCarthy at the Internet Speculative Fiction Database
 T. C. McCarthy at The Encyclopedia of Science Fiction

21st-century American male writers
21st-century American novelists
21st-century American short story writers
American male novelists
American male short story writers
American science fiction writers
Living people
University of Georgia alumni
University of Virginia alumni
Year of birth missing (living people)